Amyloidosis is the accumulation on misfolded protein fibers in the body. This is very common condition associated with many of the chronic illness. 
Haemodialysis-associated amyloidosis is a form of systemic amyloidosis associated with chronic kidney failure. Even if this is common in CKD patients with chronic regular dialysis, it can be also seen in patient with CKD but have never dialysed too.

Presentation
Long-term haemodialysis results in a gradual accumulation of β2 microglobulin, a serum protein, in the blood.  It accumulates because it is unable to cross the dialysis filter.

Affected individuals usually present after 5 years of dialysis rarely before that. The tendency of haemodialysis-associated amyloidosis is to be articular in general affecting the joints.

Diagnosis

Prevention
The mainstay of management of the dialysis related amyloidosis is the prevention than the other type of treatment methods. Because most of the medical and surgical managements for this condition may not prevent the symptoms completely. Therefore we have to take adequate precautions to prevent future dialysis disequilibrium syndrome in CKD patients. 

There are several steps in prevention of dialysis related amyloidosis. 
 
 Use of high flux dialyzers
  Use of Beta 2 globulin absorber
  Preserve the residual kidney functions
  Early kidney transplant
 

In addition low copper dialysis is theorized to prevent or delay onset.

Management
Management of haemodialysis associated amyloidosis is symptomatic. Although there are lot of methods to prevent and delay the complications, probably the steroids and analgesics may helpful in the management of the condition. 

However there are some surgical procedure to reduce the pain.

See also 
 Hepatoerythropoietic porphyria
 List of cutaneous conditions

References

External links 
https://academic.oup.com/ndt/article-pdf/13/suppl_1/58/9896967/130058.pdf

Amyloidosis
Skin conditions resulting from errors in metabolism
Renal dialysis